Sheringham Lifeboat Station is an RNLI operated lifeboat station located in the town of Sheringham in the English county of Norfolk. Since 1992, the station has been inshore operations only - currently with an Atlantic 85 rigid inflatable - offshore lifeboats are to the east at Cromer and the west at Wells-next-the-sea.

In its history there have been two Bronze Medals and 1 Silver medal awarded to crew by the RNLI.

The current lifeboat station was built in 1936 to replace a smaller older one which was located at the Old Hythe lifeboat house within the town of Sheringham.

History

Pre RNLI 
From early times the main source of income in the town of Sheringham had been fishing. In the late 1800s there were upwards of 200 fishing boats operating from the Hythe and the beaches of the town. As the fishing industry flourished the loss of life at sea increased. These recurring tragedies led the wealthy Upcher family of Sheringham Hall to donate money to enable lifeboats to be built and their generosity founded the first lifeboat service in Sheringham. At first the lifeboat service was privately run, being joined and eventually taken over by the newly named Royal National Lifeboat Institution (RNLI) in 1867.

First boathouse 
In 1838 the first boathouse for the then private service was built to house the Augusta.

Second boathouse 
In April 1866 the RNLI's assistant inspector of Lifeboats, Captain D. Robertson, had visited the town as part of his tour of the locality and he suggested that a second station run by the RNLI be placed in Sheringham. The thinking behind this decision was that the RNLI's lifeboat would bring a different option to the life saving capacities of the town's private operation. The inspector also met with members of the Upcher family and an agreement was made with Henry Upcher that he would provide land for an RNLI boathouse at East Cliff close to the town centre. Once the site had been agreed work began to build the station at a cost of £251. The building was of a brick construction and was arranged over two floors with the main boat hall at ground level and a lecture room above on the first floor. Public funds were raised to add the first floor, reached by an outside staircase, which was also used as a reading room where fishermen could rest and be educated in their free time. The route from the boat hall led past the area known as The Mo, across the promenade and onto a long timber constructed slipway. The boathouse was completed and became operational in 1867. The location proved to be unsuccessful as the access route to the sea was never straightforward and during the thirty four years that the lifeboat operated from this location, many costly repairs were made often due to the gangway being swept away in gales and high tides.

Third boathouse 
By 1904 a new boathouse and slipway had been constructed at the Old Hythe. The old boathouse (The Oddfellows Hall) on Lifeboat Plain was then given over to several uses, eventually standing idle and neglected until it was refurbished at a cost of £2.5 million to bring it back to us as a building for the community in 2007.

Gallery of the stations

Fleet 
Including the private boats there have been 11 lifeboats stationed at Sheringham:

All Weather Boats

Inshore Lifeboats

The Lifeboats

Augusta 

The first lifeboat to serve Sheringham was the privately funded Augusta. The boat was provided by Mrs Charlotte Upcher of Sheringham Hall at a cost of £134.12s.2d. Mrs Upcher had been, for sometime, concerned with the appalling loss of life during severe gales along the East coast and in particular the gale of 29 November 1826. During this brutal storm seven Sheringham fishermen were lost when their two boats overturned just offshore. Then, in January 1838, a large Sheringham fishing boat known locally as a "twenty footer" was damaged and sunk on Sheringham Shoal. These incidents prompted the establishment of the lifeboat service in Sheringham. The new lifeboat was built by Robert Sunman in the style of the local crab fishing boats. It was launched in November 1838 and was named Augusta after Mrs Upcher's recently deceased daughter. Augusta was 33 feet 6 inches long and 10 foot 3 inches wide. The power for the boat was provide by 16 oars. She was equipped with a dipping lug mainsail, mizzen sail and had fittings for a rudder at either end to avoid turning her in heavy seas.

By 1838 the Augusta was declared unseaworthy. In the late 1940s she was being used by the Norfolk Sea Scouts on the Norfolk Broads. By 1953 the now derelict lifeboat was found, cut in half and being used as a shelter at the Broads village of Ranworth. In recent years some of the Augusta'''s original planking has been preserved in a tank in Sheringham by a local businessman.

 Henry Ramey Upcher 

Uniquely Sheringham has had in the past two lifeboat services running at the same time, one private and the other operated by the RNLI. The lifeboat Henry Ramey Upcher was the boat of the private service. This lifeboat was the gift of Mrs. Caroline Upcher of Sheringham Hall, donated to the fishermen in memory of Mrs. Upcher's husband.

Rescues and service
The Henry Ramey Upcher launched to over 50 services and she worked closely with the lifeboats, William Bennett and J.C. Madge of the RNLI. She remained in service until 1935 and she saved over 200 souls.

The Henry Ramey Upcher Lifeboat Museum
Today the Henry Ramey Upcher lifeboat is preserved in original condition in her own museum which is housed in the original lifeboat shed at the top of the slipway at Old Hythe.

 Duncan 

The lifeboat Duncan was the first RNLI boat to serve at the new Sheringham station. She came to the town on 31 July 1867 and had been built at the cost of £345 with this expenditure cost being met by a donation from Mrs. Agnes Fraser, née Duncan, in memory of her father and uncle. The lifeboat had been designed by James Peake and built by Forrestt of Limehouse, London. Duncan was 36 feet long and 9 foot 4 inches wide and was self-righting by virtue of her heavy iron keel and high end boxes. She was supplied with 12 oars and a single mast with sail.

During the 19 years that Duncan was at Sheringham she was called to make 7 service launches and saved 18 lives.

 William Bennett (ON 11) 

Lifeboat William Bennett (ON 11) was the successor to Duncan. She arrived by sea at Sheringham on 7 July 1886. This lifeboat, like her predecessor, was built by Forrestt of Limehouse, London. At 41 foot 4 inches she was 5 feet longer than the Duncan. She was 9 foot 3 wide and was powered by 14 oars and was a self-righting design. This boat cost £500 13s 10d and was funded from the legacy of Mr William Bennett, a wealthy tea merchant, of Regent's Park, London. The larger lifeboat however was of no advantage to the Sheringham crew. She was considerably heavier than the Duncan and the narrow access from the boathouse to the slipway made the William Bennett a very difficult boat to launch.

During the 18 years that William Bennett was stationed at Sheringham, the lifeboat only made 4 successful service launches, saving 11 lives.

 J C Madge (ON 536) 

The lifeboat J C Madge (ON 536) replaced the William Bennett (ON 11) in 1904. this lifeboat was a Liverpool class, non-self righting, pulling and sailing lifeboat. She cost £1,436 and was funded from a legacy left by Mr James C Madge, a chemist, who came from Southampton. J C Madge'' (ON 536) arrived in Sheringham on 2 December 1904 having been sailed around the coast from Blackwall Reach in east London.

See also
Historic RNLI lifeboats
List of RNLI stations

Notes and references

External links
Sheringham lifeboat official website

Lifeboat
Lifeboat stations in Norfolk